Persatuan Sepakbola Bangka Setara (simply known as PS Bangka Setara) is an Indonesian football club based in Sungailiat, Bangka Regency, Bangka Belitung Islands. They currently compete in the Liga 3.

History
PS Bangka Setara was established in 2021, PS Bangka Setara was officially launched by the Regent of Bangka, Mulkan.

PS Bangka Setara made club debut into Indonesian football by joining the third-tier league Indonesia Liga 3 in 2021. PS Bangka Setara made their first league match debut on 5 November 2021 in a 4–0 win against Putra Laut at the Orom Stadium.

Honours
 Liga 3 Bangka Belitung Islands
 Runner-up: 2021

References

External links
 PS Bangka Setara Instagram

Football clubs in Indonesia
Football clubs in Bangka Belitung Islands
Association football clubs established in 2021
2021 establishments in Indonesia